Saint Quadratus of Athens was a Greek Apostolic Father, bishop of Athens. He is counted among the Seventy Apostles in the tradition of the Eastern Churches.

Ministry
According to the early church historian Eusebius of Caesarea he is said to have been a disciple of the Apostles (auditor apostolorum).

In his Ecclesiastical History, Book IV, chapter 3, Eusebius records that:

1. After Trajan had reigned for nineteen and a half years Ælius Adrian became his successor in the empire. To him Quadratus addressed a discourse containing an apology for our religion, because certain wicked men had attempted to trouble the Christians. The work is still in the hands of a great many of the brethren, as also in our own, and furnishes clear proofs of the man's understanding and of his apostolic orthodoxy.

2. He himself reveals the early date at which he lived in the following words: But the works of our Saviour were always present, for they were genuine:— those that were healed, and those that were raised from the dead, who were seen not only when they were healed and when they were raised, but were also always present; and not merely while the Saviour was on earth, but also after his death, they were alive for quite a while, so that some of them lived even to our day. Such then was Quadratus.

In other words, Eusebius is stating that Quadratus addressed a discourse to the Roman Emperor Hadrian containing a defense, or apology, of the Christian religion, when the latter was visiting Athens in AD 124 or 125, which Eusebius states moved the emperor to issue a favourable edict. The mention that many of those healed or raised from the dead by Christ were still living seems to be part of an argument that Christ was no mere wonder-worker whose effects were transitory.

Eusebius later summarises a letter by Dionysius of Corinth which simply states that Quadratus was appointed Bishop of Athens 'after the martyrdom of Publius', and which states that 'through his zeal they [the Athenian Christians] were brought together again and their faith revived.

P. Andriessen has suggested that Quadratus' Apology is the work known as Epistle to Diognetus, a suggestion Michael W. Holmes finds "intriguing". While admitting that Epistle to Diognetus does not contain the only quotation known from Quadratus' address, Holmes defends this identification by noting "there is a gap between 7.6 and 7.7 into which it would fit very well." Edgar J. Goodspeed states it is an ingenious theory, but says it is improbable and that the fragment does not fit the gap.

Because of the similarity of name, some scholars have concluded that Quadratus the Apologist is the same person as Quadratus, a prophet mentioned elsewhere by Eusebius (H. E., 3.37). The evidence, however, is too slight to be convincing. The later references to Quadratus in Jerome and the martyrologies are all based on Eusebius, or are arbitrary enlargements of his account.

Another apologist, Aristides, presented a similar work. Eusebius had copies of both essays. Because he was bishop of Athens after Publius, Quadratus is sometimes figured among the Apostolic Fathers. Eusebius called him a "man of understanding and of Apostolic faith", and Jerome in Viri illustrissimi intensified the apostolic connection, calling him "disciple of the apostles".

See also

References

External links
A Fragment of the  writings of Quadratus of Athens
Saint Quadratus in the Catholic Forum
Saint Quadratus in the Catholic Encyclopedia
http://www.goarch.org/en/Chapel/saints.asp?contentid=212
"Saint Quadratus", New Catholic Dictionary

Seventy disciples
Christian apologists
2nd-century Christian saints
Saints of Roman Athens
129 deaths
Year of birth unknown
Bishops of Athens